The Carolina Panthers and New Orleans Saints of the National Football League (NFL) share a rivalry with each other. The Panthers began play in 1995, joining the Saints as members of the NFC West. The Panthers won their first matchup 20–3. As part of the NFL's 2002 division realignment, the Panthers and Saints were both placed in the newly-formed NFC South. As divisional rivals, the two teams play each other twice each season. Overall, the rivalry is fairly even, with the Saints slightly leading the series 29–28.

Background
The Saints began play in 1967. The Panthers, meanwhile, were officially accepted as an NFL franchise in 1993. They began play in 1995, joining the Saints in the NFC West Division. Both located in the Southeastern United States, the Panthers and Saints had a natural geographic rivalry set-up. Ultimately, the Panthers and Saints would develop an evenly and hotly-contested rivalry. The latter would also become the most commonly-faced opponent for the former. For their entire rivalry, the two have been divisional rivals, mostly as members of the NFC South alongside the Atlanta Falcons and Tampa Bay Buccaneers.

1995–2001: NFC West rivals
On October 22, 1995, the Panthers won the first game between the two teams, 20–3. From 2000 to 2002, the Saints went on a five-game winning streak over the Panthers, their longest of the rivalry.

Sam Mills was a figure of the early Panthers–Saints rivalry. A member of the Saints' "Dome Patrol" until 1994, Mills left New Orleans to join the Panthers for their inaugural 1995 season. Mills took exception to the Saints only expressing interest in re-signing him after the Panthers made him an offer during free agency. Mills would later become a member of both the Saints' Hall of Fame and Panthers' Hall of Honor.

2002–2010: Joining the NFC South and arrival of Drew Brees

After facing off as NFC West rivals from 1995 to 2001, the Saints and Panthers were moved to the newly-formed NFC South in 2002.

In 2003, the Panthers defeated the Saints 23–20 in an overtime game en route to their first Super Bowl appearance.

In 2006, quarterback Drew Brees joined the Saints. Sean Payton also joined New Orleans as the team's head coach. The Brees–Payton pairing brought the franchise success, which it notably lacked prior to their arrival. Brees' record against the Panthers was documented to be historically close in both 2012 and 2015. However, Brees would win his final 8 matches against Carolina and finish his career with an 18–11 record against them. In his first twelve seasons as the Saints' starter, Brees only missed two games, both road losses at Carolina.

2011–2017: Cam Newton in Carolina and playoff matchup
After a poor performance during their 2010 season, the Carolina Panthers selected quarterback Cam Newton first overall during the 2011 NFL Draft. Linebacker Luke Kuechly was drafted by the Panthers in 2012, becoming a noted figure in the rivalry. Newton was allegedly one of the quarterbacks named in the Saints' Bountygate scandal.

During the final week of the 2011 season, the Saints defeated the Panthers. In the game, Brees extended his single-season record for most passing yards, finishing the season with 5,476 and also set the single-season record for most passing completions. In the game, Newton also became the first rookie quarterback to pass for over 4,000 yards in a season.

Often engaging in physical and hotly-contested matches, the Saints and Panthers have had scuffles and brawls during matches against each other. The 2014 season saw chippy games between the two squads; during the second matchup, the teams engaged in numerous fights and "an infamous all-out brawl after a Cam Newton touchdown run, resulting in multiple player ejections."

Both teams were successful during their 2017 campaigns, each winning 11 games. The Saints won both regular season matches and won the NFC South division, but the Panthers qualified for the postseason as a wild card. This set up a third game between the two teams during the NFC Wild Card round. New Orleans won at home in what would be a close game, 31–26.

2018–2021: Final seasons of Brees and Newton
The Panthers and Newton would part ways following the 2019 season. Brees would retire from the NFL following the 2020 season. Brees passed for 7,949 yards and 55 touchdowns in his career against the Panthers, both figures higher than any other player. In what would be his final regular season game, Brees threw for three touchdowns and led the Saints to a 33–7 victory over the Panthers. In doing so, the Saints completed a season sweep of the entire NFC South division, becoming the first team to do so.

Newton briefly returned to the Panthers in 2021, but was on the bench against the Saints. The 2021 season would also be the last for Payton, as he retired from coaching following the season.

Season-by-season results 

|-
| 
| Tie 1–1
| style="| Panthers  20–3
| style="| Saints  34–26
| Tied  1–1
| Panthers' inaugural season.
|-
| 
| style="| Panthers 2–0
| style="| Panthers  19–7
| style="| Panthers  22–20
| Panthers  3–1
| Panthers sweep season series for first time
|-
| 
| Tie 1–1
| style="| Saints  16–13
| style="| Panthers  13–0
| Panthers  4–2
| 
|-
| 
| Tie 1–1
| style="| Panthers  31–17
| style="| Saints  19–14
| Panthers  5–3
|
|-
| 
| Tie 1–1
| style="| Panthers  45–13
| style="| Saints  19–10
| Panthers  6–4
| Panthers' 45–13 victory over the Saints is their largest margin of victory in the rivalry.
|-

|-
| 
| style="| Saints 2–0
| style="| Saints  20–10
| style="| Saints  24–6
| Tied  6–6
| Saints sweep season series for first time
|-
| 
| style="| Saints 2–0
| style="| Saints  25–23
| style="| Saints  27–23
| Saints  8–6
| 
|-
| 
| Tie 1–1
| style="| Saints  34–24
| style="| Panthers  10–6
| Saints  9–7
| 
|-
| 
| style="| Panthers 2–0
| style="| Panthers  19–13
| style="| Panthers  23–20 (OT)
| Tied  9–9
| Panthers lose Super Bowl XXXVIII
|-
| 
| Tie 1–1
| style="| Saints  21–18
| style="| Panthers  32–21
| Tied  10–10
| 
|-
| 
| Tie 1–1
| style="| Saints  23–20
| style="| Panthers  27–10
| Tied  11–11
| 
|-
| 
| style="| Panthers 2–0
| style="| Panthers  21–18
| style="| Panthers  31–21
| Panthers  13–11
| Drew Brees' first season with the Saints.
|-
| 
| Tie 1–1
| style="| Saints  31–6
| style="| Panthers  16–13
| Panthers  14–12
| 
|-
| 
| style="| Panthers 2–0
| style="| Panthers  30–7
| style="| Panthers  33–31
| Panthers  16–12
| 
|-
| 
| Tie 1–1
| style="| Panthers  23–10
| style="| Saints  30–20
| Panthers  17–13
| Saints win Super Bowl XLIV
|-

|-
| 
| style="| Saints 2–0
| style="| Saints  34–3
| style="| Saints  16–14
| Panthers  17–15
| 
|-
| 
| style="| Saints 2–0
| style="| Saints  30–27
| style="| Saints  45–17
| Tied  17–17
| Cam Newton's first season with the Panthers.
|-
| 
| style="| Panthers 2–0
| style="| Panthers  35–27
| style="| Panthers  44–38
| Panthers  19–17
|
|-
| 
| Tie 1–1
| style="| Panthers  17–13
| style="| Saints  31–13
| Panthers  20–18
| 
|-
| 
| Tie 1–1
| style="| Saints  28–10
| style="| Panthers  41–10
| Panthers  21–19
|
|-
| 
| style="| Panthers 2–0
| style="| Panthers  27–22
| style="| Panthers  41–38
| Panthers  23–19
| Panthers lose Super Bowl 50. Cam Newton named AP MVP.
|-
| 
| Tie 1–1
| style="| Panthers  23–20
| style="| Saints  41–38
| Panthers  24–20
| 
|-
| 
| style="| Saints 2–0
| style="| Saints  34–13
| style="| Saints  31–21
| Panthers  24–22
|
|- style="font-weight:bold; background:#f2f2f2;"
| 2017 Playoffs
| style="| 
| 
| style="| Saints  31–26
| Panthers  24–23
| NFC Wild Card playoffs, first playoff meeting between the two teams.
|-
| 
| Tie 1–1
| style="| Saints  12–9
| style="| Panthers  33–14
| Panthers  25–24
|
|-
| 
| style="| Saints 2–0
| style="| Saints  42–10
| style="| Saints  34–31
| Saints  26–25
|
|-

|-
| 
| style="| Saints 2–0
| style="| Saints  33–7
| style="| Saints  27–24
| Saints  28–25
| Game in Charlotte was Brees' final regular season game and victory.
|-
| 
| Tie 1–1
| style="| Panthers  26–7
| style="| Saints  18–10
| Saints  29–26
| 
|-
| 
| style="| Panthers 2–0
| style="| Panthers  22–14
| style="| Panthers  10–7
| Saints  29–28
|
|- 

|-
| Regular season
| 
| Tied 14–14
| Tied 14–14
|  
|-
| Postseason
| style="|Saints 1–0
| no games
| Saints 1–0
| 2017 NFC Wild Card round
|-
| Regular and postseason 
| style="|
| Tied 14–14
| Saints 15–14
| 
|-

Notes

References

Further reading

Carolina Panthers
New Orleans Saints
National Football League rivalries
Carolina Panthers rivalries
New Orleans Saints rivalries